A pantry is a food store. The term may also refer to:

People
John Pantry, musician

Business
The Original Pantry Cafe, an iconic Los Angeles restaurant
The Pantry, an American convenience store located primarily in the Southeastern United States

Other
Pantry, the area to the right and left of the non-volley zone in pickleball